The 2022 WTA Poland Open (also known as the BNP Paribas Poland Open for sponsorship purposes) was a women's tennis tournament played on outdoor clay courts. It was the second edition of the WTA Poland Open, and part of the WTA 250 series of the 2022 WTA Tour. It was held at the Legia Tennis Centre in Warsaw, Poland, from 25 until 31 July 2022.

Champions

Singles 

  Caroline Garcia def.  Ana Bogdan, 6–4, 6–1.

This was Garcia's ninth WTA Tour singles title, and second of the year.

Doubles 

  Anna Danilina /  Anna-Lena Friedsam def.  Katarzyna Kawa /  Alicja Rosolska, 6–4, 5–7, [10–5]

Singles main draw entrants

Seeds

† Rankings are as of 18 July 2022.

Other entrants 
The following players received wildcard entry into the singles main draw:
  Maja Chwalińska
  Weronika Falkowska
  Martyna Kubka

The following player received entry into the main draw with a protected ranking:
  Nadia Podoroska

The following players received entry from the qualifying draw:
  Alexandra Cadanțu-Ignatik
  Sara Errani
  Arianne Hartono
  Jesika Malečková
  Raluca Șerban
  Rebeka Masarova

The following players received entry as lucky losers:
  Kateryna Baindl 
  Gabriela Lee
  Laura Pigossi

Withdrawals 
 Before the tournament
  Irina-Camelia Begu → replaced by  Laura Pigossi
  Kaja Juvan → replaced by  Magdalena Fręch
  Marta Kostyuk → replaced by  Danka Kovinić
  Yulia Putintseva → replaced by  Kateryna Baindl
  Laura Siegemund → replaced by  Ana Bogdan
  Sara Sorribes Tormo → replaced by  Gabriela Lee
  Zhang Shuai → replaced by  Misaki Doi
  Tamara Zidanšek → replaced by  Clara Burel

Doubles main draw entrants

Seeds 

† Rankings are as of 18 July 2022.

Other entrants 
The following pairs received wildcard entry into main draw:
  Zuzanna Bednarz /  Weronika Ewald
  Ania Hertel /  Martyna Kubka

The following pair received entry into main draw using a protected ranking:
  Paula Kania-Choduń /  Renata Voráčová

Withdrawals
  Sophie Chang /  Angela Kulikov → replaced by  Nuria Párrizas Díaz /  Arantxa Rus
  Anna Danilina /  Aleksandra Krunić → replaced by  Anna Danilina /  Anna-Lena Friedsam
  Katarzyna Kawa /  Vivian Heisen → replaced by  Andrea Gámiz /  Laura Pigossi
  Katarzyna Piter /  Alicja Rosolska → replaced by  Katarzyna Kawa /  Alicja Rosolska
  Laura Siegemund /  Zhang Shuai → replaced by  Réka Luca Jani /  Adrienn Nagy

References

External links 
 Official website

Poland Open
Tennis tournaments in Poland
Orange Warsaw Open
Poland Open
Poland Open
Poland Open